A kraplap is a traditional Dutch breastcloth garment made of stiff, starched cotton which was once worn by women throughout the Netherlands but which has all but disappeared by the early 21st century.

References

Dutch clothing